The 2018 Ohio Senate election was held on November 6, 2018, with the primary election held on May 8, 2018. Ohio voters elected state senators in the 17 odd-numbered Ohio Senate districts. State senators elected in 2018 are eligible to serve a four-year term beginning January 2019 and ending December 2022. These elections coincided with elections for Ohio Governor, the Ohio House, the U.S. House of Representatives, the U.S. Senate, and other statewide offices.

Despite a moderate statewide swing that allowed the Democrats to win the popular vote, the Republicans retained their supermajority of 24 seats in the Senate, compared to the Democrats' 9 seats.

Statewide results

Results by district

Overview 

|}

Detailed results

District 1

Primary results

General election results

District 3

Primary results

General election results

District 5

Primary results

General election results

District 7

Primary results

General election results

District 9

Primary results

General election results

District 11

Primary results

General election results

District 13

Primary results

General election results

District 15

Primary results

General election results

District 17

Primary results

General election results

District 19

Primary results

General election results

District 21

Primary results

General election results

District 23

Primary results

General election results

District 25

Primary results

General election results

District 27

Primary results

General election results

District 29

Primary results

General election results

District 31

Primary results

General election results

District 33

Primary results

General election results

Notes

References 

Ohio Senate
Senate
Ohio Senate elections